Caroline of Hanover may refer to:

 Caroline of Ansbach (1683–1737), Queen of Great Britain and Ireland, Electress of Hanover
 Caroline of Brunswick (1768–1821), Queen of the United Kingdom and Hanover
 Caroline of Monaco (born 1957), Princess of Hanover